A list of things named after Soviet scientist, Vladimir Fock:
 Fock matrix
Fock operator
Fock representation
 Fock space
Fock state
Fock–Lorentz symmetry
Fock–Schwinger gauge
 Hartree–Fock method
Post–Hartree–Fock
Restricted open-shell Hartree–Fock
Unrestricted Hartree–Fock
 Klein–Gordon–Fock equation
 Mehler–Fock transform

See also

References

Fock